Groupe de Combat 12 (GC 12) 'Les Cigognes' ('The Storks') was the most celebrated and successful French Air Service Groupe de Chasse during the World War I. Its roster included Georges Guynemer, René Dorme, Alfred Heurteaux, René Fonck, Raoul Echard, Joseph-Henri Guiguet, Roland Garros, Mathieu Tenant de la Tour, Jean Laulhé, among other French World War I aces. The fliers from CG 12 carried different stork insignia on their planes.

History

It originated as an ad hoc group, Groupement de Combat de la Somme. Four escadrilles were consolidated in this group—Escadrilles N3, N26, N73, and N103. Founded on 16 April 1916 to fight in the Second Battle of the Aisne, the makeshift group also had three other escadrilles temporarily assigned—N37, N62, and N65. The group was placed under command of Capitaine Felix Brocard; he was promoted from command of Escadrille 3N. On 1 November 1916, it was formalized as Groupe de Combat 12; its original table of organization contained the four permanent escadrilles.

On 28 January 1917, the unit was posted to the X Armee. It transferred to the VII Armee in March. On 12 July, it moved to support Ier Armee in Flanders. GC 12 was transferred to VI Armee again on 11 December 1917. On 18 January 1918, Escadrille 67 replaced Escadrille 73 within the groupe. The groupe made the transition to support X Armee on 5 June 1918; to V Armee on 17 July; to Ier Armee on 29 July; and to IV Armee on 18 September 1918.

Commanding officers
 Capitaine Felix Brocard: 1 November 1916 - early 1918
 Capitaine Horment: early 1918 - 4 May 1918
 Capitaine Charles Dupuy: 4 May 1918 - end of war

Assignments
 X Armee: 28 January 1917
 VIII Armee: March 1917
 Ier Armee: 12 July 1917
 VI Armee: 11 December 1917
 X Armee: 5 June 1918
 V Armee: 17 July 1918
 Ier Armee: 29 July 1918
 IV Armee: 18 September 1918

References

Bibliography

Further reading
 Brèche, Yves, and Patrice Buffotot. Historique du Groupe de chasse I/2: "Les Cigognes", 1914-1945. Vincennes: Service historique de l'Armée de l'air, 1981. 
 Franks, Norman L. R., and Frank W. Bailey. The Storks: The Story of the Les Cigognes, France's Élite Fighter Group of WW1. London: Grub Street, 1998. 
 Guttman, Jon. Groupe De Combat 12, Les Cigognes: France's Ace Fighter Group in World War 1. Oxford: Osprey, 2004. 
 Guynemer et les Cigognes. Orly Aérogare, France: Icare, 1967.

External links
 GC 12

Military units and formations of the French Air and Space Force